T. Siddique (born 1 June 1974) is an Indian politician and he is currently one of the three Working Presidents of Kerala Pradesh Congress Committee and a member of the Indian National Congress.

Political career 
He was a KSU leader and union chairman at Devagiri College, Kozhikode. He was the former state president of the Youth Congress Kerala, KPCC General Secretary and KPCC Vice President. In 2014, he contested from Kasaragod Lok Sabha  Constituency. He lost to CPIM Candidate P Karunakaran by slight margin in Communist bastion. In 2016, he contested from Kunnamangalam Assembly constituency in Kerala Assembly election. He lost to PTA Rahim in the left wave at Kunnamangalam, the CPIM stronghold. In 2019, he got Wayanad Loksabha seat for contest, he started election campaign after KPCC President Mullappally Ramachandran's Wayanad candidate declaration. AICC president Rahul Gandhi decided to contest from Wayanad along with Amethi Loksabha seat after some days. Then, T Siddique decided to withdraw his candidature from Wayanad Loksabha seat with pleasure. Rahul Gandhi contested from Wayanad and won with record margin. In 2021, Rahul Gandhi decided to give Kalpetta Assembly Constituency seat to T Siddique. He contested from Kalpetta Assembly Constituency from Wayanad District. He defeated the Left Front's LJD candidate  M. V. Shreyams Kumar  in CPM's sitting seat. T Siddique is current MLA of Kalpetta Assembly Constituency.

Personal life 
T Siddique was born in Panteerankavu, Kozhikode to Thuvakkodu Kasim and Nafeesa Kasim on June 1, 1974. His father was an employee of the Kasaragod Electricity Department. But he soon returned to Kozhikode, his hometown. He married Naseema, a teacher from Kollam district, and they divorced in 2015 by mutual consent. He has two sons from this marriage. Aadil and Aashique. He is still close to his children. He later married Sharafunnisa, a writer from Kannur. He has a son with Sharafunnisa named Zil Yazdan. After winning from Kalpetta Assembly Constituency and becoming an MLA, he moved from Kozhikode to Kalpetta.

Education 
He completed high school from Pantheeramkavu High School in the year 1989. Afterwards he joined for Pre- Degree at Zamorin's Guruvayoorappan College. He finished his Bachelor of Commerce degree from St. Joseph's College Devagiri in the year 1994. He also did a Diploma in Computer Science from Lakhotia Institute of Computer Science and graduated LLB (Bachelor of law) from the law college in the state of Kerala, Kozhikode Govt. Law College in the year of 2000.

Political positions held 
KSU Unit President, St.Joseph's College Devagiri, 1993

Chairman, College Union, St.Joseph's College Devagiri, 1993–94

KSU Unit President, Govt. Law College, Kozhikode, 1996 -1998.

Elected as Senate Member, University of Calicut, 1997 to 2000

Youth Congress Peruvayal Mandalam General Secretary, 1994 to 1997

Youth Congress Perumanna Mandalam Vice President, 1997 to 2000

UDF Election Committee Convener of Kunnamangalam Assembly Constituency, 2001.

UDF Election Committee Convener of Kozhikode Parliament Constituency, 2009

Member Samavaya Committee of Kozhikode District Congress Committee. Vice President, Kerala Pradesh Youth Congress Committee, 2002 to 2006

President, Kerala Pradesh Youth Congress Committee, 2006 to 2008

Member of Kerala Pradesh Congress Committee, 2008 to 2013

General Secretary of Kerala Pradesh Congress Committee, 2012 to 2016

Kozhikode DCC President, 2016 to 2020. KPCC Vice President, 2019 to 2021

Working President 2021 to present.

References 

https://www.ndtv.com/elections/kerala-assembly-election-candidates-list-2021/t-siddique-11019-6
https://www.thehindu.com/news/national/kerala/congress-picks-siddiqque-for-wayanad/article26571118.ece/amp/

21st-century Indian politicians
Indian National Congress politicians from Kerala
Malayali politicians
Politicians from Kozhikode
Living people
1976 births